

Daniel Torres (born 20 August 1958) is a Spanish cartoonist, known for several series, including the science-fiction series Rocco Vargas, about a writer in a retrofuturistic world and Tom, a series for children about a friendly dinosaur.

Biography

Childhood and youth 
Son of a rural doctor, Daniel Torres frequently changed residence during his childhood. In 1975, he began architecture studies at the University of Valencia, although he would finally end up replacing them with those of Fine Arts. At the same time, he began collaborating with "The Gat Pelat" through Miguel Calatayud.

In 1980, already installed in Barcelona, he began his professional career in "El Víbora" with murder in 64 images per second, making the character of him Claudio Cueco, fruit of his university stage.

Bibliography
 Opium (Partly published in English by Knockabout and Heavy Metal)
 Sabotage! (Published in English by Dark Horse Comics)
 Tom (1995–present)
 Burbujas (Norma 2009)
 La casa (Norma, 2015)

Rocco Vargas
Rocco Vargas adventures in English include:
 Triton (Catalan 1986)
 The Whisperer Mystery (Catalan 1990)
 Saxxon (Catalan 1991)
 Rocco Vargas HC (Dark Horse 1998) Reprints three earlier stories and a new, Far Star.
 Rocco Vargas: The Dark Forest (HC, Dark Horse 2001)
 Rocco Vargas: A Game of Gods (HC, Dark Horse 2004)
 Rocco Vargas: Walking with Monsters (HC, Dark Horse 2005)

References

 Daniel Torres bio Norma Editorial 
 Daniel Torres bio FFF 
 Daniel Torres albums Bedetheque

External links
Daniel Torres official site 
Daniel Torres biography on Lambiek Comiclopedia

1958 births
Living people
People from the Province of Valencia
Artists from the Valencian Community
Spanish comics artists
Writers from the Valencian Community
Spanish comics writers
Spanish cartoonists
20th-century Spanish artists